Nakunte Diarra (born c. 1941) is a Malian textile artist, a creator of bògòlanfini.

A member of the Bamana tribe, Diarra learned the basics of creating bògòlanfini from her mother when she was four years old. She has been based in Kolokani for much of her career, but has traveled widely to give workshops and demonstrations of her technique, including spending two weeks at the Smithsonian Folklife Festival in 2003. In 1993 30 of her works were exhibited in an exhibition organized by the Indiana University Art Museum that also traveled to the Fashion Institute of Technology. Her art was the subject of an article, "Nakunte Diarra: Bogolanfini Artist of the Bélédougou", published in the journal African Arts in 1994, and of a DVD produced in 2005. Two pieces by Diarra were commissioned for the collection of the Indiana University Art Museum, while other cloths are owned by the National Museum of African Art, the National Museum of Natural History, and the National Museum of Mali. Diarra's work was represented in the exhibition, "Earth Matters," at the National Museum of African Art in 2014. Diarra was the subject of My Baby, a children's book by Jeanette Winter, featuring a fictional account of the Malian artist as she created mudcloth during her pregnancy for her own child.

References

1940s births
Year of birth uncertain
Living people
Textile artists
Malian women artists
Women textile artists
20th-century women textile artists
21st-century women textile artists
Bamana people
People from Koulikoro Region
20th-century textile artists
21st-century textile artists
21st-century Malian people